The Tecma F1 Tempo is a French high-wing, single-place, hang glider that was designed and produced by Tecma Sport of La Roche-sur-Foron. Now out of production, when it was available the aircraft was supplied complete and ready-to-fly.

Design and development
The F1 Tempo is made from aluminum tubing, with the double-surface wing covered in Dacron sailcloth. Its wing is cable braced from a single kingpost. The nose angle is 130° for both models.

The models are each named for their wing area in square metres and decimals of square metres.

Variants
F1 Tempo 136
Small-sized model for lighter pilots. Its  span wing is cable braced from a single kingpost.
F1 Tempo 142
Large-sized model for heavier pilots. Its  span wing is cable braced from a single kingpost.

Specifications (F1 Tempo 136)

References

F1
Hang gliders